Tony Black is a Scottish writer. Much of his work is in the tartan noir crime genre, featuring Gus Dury, Rob Brennan and Doug Michie. He has more recently pursued projects in other literary directions. Irvine Welsh has called Black his "favourite British crime writer".

He was born in Australia to Scottish parents, and raised in Scotland and Ireland.

Bibliography
 Gutted
 Truth Lies Bleeding
 Artefacts of the Dead
 The Storm Without
 Paying for It
 Murder Mile
 The Inglorious Dead
 The Last Tiger
 His Father's Son
 The Ringer
 Loss
 Long Time Dead
 Ten Bells at Robbie's
 Last Orders
 RIP Robbie Silva
 The Holy Father
 London Calling
 Hard Truths (contributor)
 The Sin Bin
 The Lost Generation
 Killing Time in Vegas

References

External links
 Official website
 Interview in Daily Record

Scottish crime writers
Australian crime writers
Australian people of Scottish descent
Living people
Year of birth missing (living people)
Tartan Noir writers